The Senior CLASS Award is presented each year to the outstanding senior NCAA Division I Student-Athlete of the Year in men's basketball. The acronym "CLASS" stands for Celebrating Loyalty and Achievement for Staying in School. The award was established in 2001. The ten finalists for the Senior CLASS Award are described as Senior All-Americans.

Winners

References

External links
 Official site

Awards established in 2001
College basketball trophies and awards in the United States
College men's basketball in the United States
Student athlete awards in the United States